Robert Ross "Roy" Knight (12 December 1891 – 11 September 1971) was a Co-operative Commonwealth Federation member of the House of Commons of Canada. He was born in Cookstown, County Tyrone, Northern Ireland and became a farmer and teacher by career.

Knight lived in Northern Ireland during his childhood, attending the Royal School Dungannon. He moved to Canada in 1909, attended Saskatoon Normal School, then Queen's University in Kingston, Ontario, where he received his Bachelor of Arts.

He was first elected at the Saskatoon City riding in the 1945 general election, then re-elected at Saskatoon in 1949 and again in 1953. Knight was defeated by Henry Frank Jones of the Progressive Conservative party in the 1957 election. Knight was again unsuccessful there in 1958.

References

External links
 

1891 births
1971 deaths
Canadian farmers
Co-operative Commonwealth Federation MPs
20th-century Canadian politicians
Members of the House of Commons of Canada from Saskatchewan
Northern Ireland emigrants to Canada
Queen's University at Kingston alumni
People from Cookstown